Grant Potter is an American road bicycle racer, from Florida. Potter was the Gold medalist of the 2010 Worlds Masters Stage Race, 2009 U.S. Masters National Champion, 2010 UCI Worlds top 5 finisher, 2010 Deutschlandsberg Worlds TT winner among many other titles.

Grant is currently the team captain of the 2013 Team Graner-Stradalli.

References

External links 

Grant Potter profile

American male cyclists
Living people
Year of birth missing (living people)
Place of birth missing (living people)